The Louisville and Nashville Depot is a historic railroad station in Evergreen, Conecuh County, Alabama, United States.

History
The station building was constructed by the Louisville & Nashville Railroad in 1907 at a cost of $14,911 ( adjusted for inflation). During the early 19th century, the station served as a gathering place for one of the social occasions of the small town, the meeting of the Sunday afternoon train.

It is now in a very good state of preservation, although it was threatened by demolition during the 1970s. The station was listed on the National Register of Historic Places on April 3, 1975.

The last train service to utilize the station was Amtrak's Gulf Breeze, which stopped in Evergreen during its run from 1989 to 1995.

Design
The one-story wood-frame building rests atop a low concrete foundation.

References

External links

National Register of Historic Places in Conecuh County, Alabama
Buildings and structures in Conecuh County, Alabama
Evergreen
Evergreen
Railway stations in the United States opened in 1907
Railway stations in the United States opened in 1989
Railway stations closed in 1995
Railway stations on the National Register of Historic Places in Alabama